Commander Edward Downes Law, 5th Baron Ellenborough (9 May 1841 – 9 December 1915), was a British Royal Navy officer and member of the House of Lords.

Naval career
Law was educated at Charterhouse and entered the Royal Navy in 1854 aged just 13.

He became a sub-lieutenant in 1860 and a lieutenant in 1861, and in 1867 he passed as an interpreter in French. During the American Civil War, he was serving on the North America and West Indies Station. He transferred to the frigate , and was with her in China during the Second Opium War (1859–1861) and was awarded the Second China War Medal. In 1873, he was lieutenant commanding , and saw service during the Third Anglo-Ashanti War and was awarded the Ashanti Medal. He retired as commander later in 1873.

Baron Ellenborough
Law was the eldest son of Henry Spencer Law and succeeded to the peerage on the death of his cousin, Charles Towry-Law, 4th Baron Ellenborough, in June 1902. He took his seat in the House of Lords on 29 July 1902.

Family
Lord Ellenborough married in 1906 Hermione Octavia Croghan Schenley, daughter of E. W. H. Schenley, of Pittsburgh, and ward of Andrew Carnegie, and they lived at Windlesham Court in Surrey. He died in 1915 and was succeeded by his brother Cecil Law, 6th Baron Ellenborough.

Ancestry

References

Members of the British House of Lords
Edward 5
People educated at Charterhouse School
1841 births
1915 deaths